ACPA  may refer to:

Aboriginal Centre for the Performing Arts
The Arts & College Preparatory Academy
Allegheny County Port Authority
American Catholic Philosophical Association
 American Catholic Psychological Association
American China Policy Association
American College Personnel Association
American Concrete Pavement Association
Anticybersquatting Consumer Protection Act
Anti-citrullinated protein antibody
Arachidonylcyclopropylamide
Armenian College and Philanthropic Academy
Association of Certified Public Accountants
4,4'-Azobis(4-cyanopentanoic acid)